Kamalatho Naa Prayanam is a 2014 Indian Telugu-language film directed by Narasimha Nandi marking his third film after the award-winning 2008 film 1940 Lo Oka Gramam. This film produced by Isanaka Sunil Reddy and Siddharth Bogulu on Livitha Universal Films features Sivaji and Archana in the lead roles. It is about a woman who is striving to get out of her job as a sex worker and the betrayal she faced from the person she loved after believing rumors about her private life.

KK composed the music while S. Murali Mohan Reddy handled the Cinematography of the film. V. Nagi Reddy provided the Editing for the film. The film was launched on 1 June 2013 in Hyderabad. The Principal photography started from 25 August 2013 and ended on 25 September 2013 in a single schedule.

Cast
Sivaji as Suryanarayana 
Archana as Kamala Rani
Pavala Syamala
Sunny K

Production
The film was formally launched at Hyderabad on 1 June 2013 at Hyderabad. On the same day, a set of posters were released featuring Archana in two attires with one being a bold prostitute and the other being a bride. In an interaction to the media in early June 2013, Narasimha Nandi, about the film, spoke "The story is set against the 1950 backdrop and shows how all her efforts to lead a normal life fail and she takes her life after the only man whom she trusts also betrays her. The film is being shot in Rajamundry and Hyderabad."

The Principal photography started from 25 August 2013 and ended on 10 September 2013 in a single schedule. According to producers the film was shot in scenic locations like Araku, Ranasthali, Rajahmundry, Singanapalli and Pattiseema which are known for their aesthetic locations. Narasimha Nandi then said that most of the film was shot in rain due to the story's demand. Three songs and 40% of the film's talkie part was wrapped up in the first schedule which ended in the end of June 2013. Finally the film's shoot ended on 10 September 2013 after which the Editing process started. The post production activities came to an end in early January 2014 which was confirmed by a press note.

Later, in an interview to the media, Sivaji spoke about his character in the film. He spoke "I change the way I look — from the clothes I wear to my dressing to my moustache, hair styling. A military man who works in the Burmese Army, comes hunting for a friend and meets a girl called Kamala and falls for her." He also added "The entire film was shot in rain from the first frame to the last frame. Wherever there was water we would stop and shoot there. We must have used water from many lakes".

Soundtrack
Kishan Kavadiya aka KK composed the Music for the film while Vanamali penned the lyrics for all the songs. In early January 2014, it was reported that the film's audio would be launched on 25 January 2014. The film's audio was launched on the said date at Hyderabad. The entire cast and crew made their way to the event which was a fun filled affair. Veteran director Dasari Narayana Rao and ex Andhra Pradesh Assembly speaker Suresh Reddy unveiled the audio.

References

2010s Telugu-language films
Films about prostitution in India